is an exceptionally eccentric trans-Neptunian object and damocloid on an orbit typical of long-period comets but one that showed no sign of cometary activity around the time it was discovered.

Description 

 orbits the Sun at a distance of 2.5–504 AU once every 4,033 years (semi-major axis of 253 AU). Its orbit has an eccentricity of 0.99 and an inclination of 30° with respect to the ecliptic.

Simulations indicate that it has most likely come from the Oort cloud, with a roughly equal probability of being an extinct comet and a rocky body that was originally scattered into the Oort cloud. The discovery of  prompted theoretical research that suggests that roughly 1 to 2 percent of the Oort cloud objects are rocky.

 was first observed on 9 August 1996 by the Near-Earth Asteroid Tracking (NEAT) automated search camera on Haleakala Observatory, Hawaii. It is the first object that is not an active comet discovered on an orbit typical of long-period comets.

 has a rotation period of  hours and a double-peaked lightcurve with a high amplitude of  magnitude. Its spectrum is moderately red and featureless, typical of D-type asteroids and bare comet nuclei. Its spectrum suggests an extinct comet.

See also 
 Extinct comets
 List of Solar System objects by greatest aphelion

References

External links 
 1996 PW, Small Bodies Data Ferret
 
 

Trans-Neptunian objects

Damocloids

Minor planet object articles (unnumbered)
Discoveries by NEAT
Ld-type asteroids (SMASS)
19960809